Helm Point is a point which marks the southeast tip of Honeycomb Ridge on the west side of Moubray Bay, Antarctica. It consists of brown granodiorite and supports a relatively luxuriant vegetation of lichens and mosses, along with nests of snow petrels and Wilson's petrels. Two Japanese whale-chasers, apparently familiar with the site, dropped anchor there for two nights early in February 1958. It was named by the New Zealand Geological Survey Antarctic Expedition, 1957–58, for Arthur S. Helm, secretary of the Ross Sea Committee, who gave much assistance to the expedition. Helm was also secretary of the New Zealand Antarctic Place-Names Committee, 1957–64.

References

Headlands of Victoria Land
Borchgrevink Coast